Ivan Ćosić (born 13 October 1989) is a Croatian-German former professional footballer who played as a defender.

Career
Born in Reutlingen, Ćosić began his career with his hometown club, SSV Reutlingen 05, before moving to Stuttgart to have spells in the youth teams of both VfB and Kickers. He returned to Reutlingen in 2008, where he made his breakthrough, making 35 appearances in two seasons in the Regionalliga Süd. In 2010, he joined Bayern Munich II, but was due to injuries he was unable to make his debut until February 2011, when he replaced Christian Saba at half-time in a 2–0 defeat against Eintracht Braunschweig. He made a further three substitute appearances before the end of the season, as the club were relegated from the 3. Liga, and he was subsequently released by the club, signing for Eintracht Frankfurt II. He was released by Frankfurt six months later and signed for Maccabi Netanya.

References

External links

Living people
1989 births
German people of Croatian descent
Croatian footballers
Association football defenders
3. Liga players
Israeli Premier League players
SSV Reutlingen 05 players
FC Bayern Munich II players
Eintracht Frankfurt II players
Maccabi Netanya F.C. players
Croatian expatriate footballers
Croatian expatriate sportspeople in Israel
Expatriate footballers in Israel
People from Reutlingen
Sportspeople from Tübingen (region)
Footballers from Baden-Württemberg